Danielle Treasure (born 3 September 2003) is a Barbadian swimmer. She competed in the women's 200 metre backstroke event at the 2018 FINA World Swimming Championships (25 m), in Hangzhou, China. In 2019, she represented Barbados at the 2019 World Aquatics Championships in Gwangju, South Korea. She competed in the women's 200 metre freestyle and women's 400 metre freestyle events.

References

2003 births
Living people
Barbadian female swimmers
Female backstroke swimmers
Barbadian female freestyle swimmers
Place of birth missing (living people)
Swimmers at the 2022 Commonwealth Games
Commonwealth Games competitors for Barbados